The Nutty Royale is an ice cream-based frozen snack made by H.P. Hood LLC dairy company. 

It consists of a chilled ice cream cone filled with vanilla ice cream with a topping of chocolate sauce or fudge and a sprinkling of nut shards.
It is similar to the "Drumstick" produced by Nestle. The "Royale" can be found in boxes of 4 or 8.

Ice cream brands